Sudice may refer to:

Places in the Czech Republic
Sudice (Blansko District), a municipality and village in the South Moravian Region
Sudice (Opava District), a municipality and village in the Moravian-Silesian Region
Sudice (Třebíč District), a municipality and village in the Vysočina Region

Other
Sudice (mythology), Slavic mythological beings